Hafez-e-esteghlal is an Iranian newspaper in the Fars region. The Concessionaire of this newspaper was Abolhasan Dehghan and it has been published in Shiraz since 1916.

See also
List of magazines and newspapers of Fars

References

Newspapers published in Fars Province
Mass media in Fars Province
Publications established in 1916
1916 establishments in Iran
Newspapers published in Qajar Iran